KTFV-CD, virtual and UHF digital channel 32, is a low-power, Class A licensed to McAllen, Texas, United States, serving the Lower Rio Grande Valley as an affiliate of the Spanish-language UniMás network. It is owned by Entravision Communications alongside McAllen-licensed Univision affiliate KNVO (channel 48), Harlingen-licensed Fox/MyNetworkTV affiliate KFXV, channel 60 (and translators KMBH-LD and KXFX-CD), and primary CW+ affiliate and secondary PBS member KCWT-CD (channel 21). The stations share studios on North Jackson Road in McAllen, while KTFV-CD's transmitter is located near Scissors, Texas.

Outline profile

After XHRIO dropped the Fox affiliation for MundoFox, residents of the lower Rio Grande Valley had trouble receiving the new low-power Fox signal. Due to this, it was decided to add a feed of KFXV to the second subchannel of KTFV and display it as 67.1 (same display channel as KFXV) in an attempt to reach a larger audience.

In addition to its own digital signal, KTFV-CD is simulcast in widescreen standard definition on KNVO's second digital subchannel (UHF channel 49.2 or virtual channel 48.2 via PSIP) from a transmitter on Farm to Market Road 493, near Donna, Texas.

Technical information

Subchannels
The station's digital signal is multiplexed:

References

External links

Television stations in the Lower Rio Grande Valley
UniMás network affiliates
Spanish-language television stations in Texas
Low-power television stations in the United States
Television channels and stations established in 1998
Entravision Communications stations